Ješkova Ves is a village and municipality in Partizánske District in the Trenčín Region of western Slovakia.

History
In historical records the village was first mentioned in 1430.

Geography
The municipality lies at an altitude of 226 metres and covers an area of 10.393 km². It has a population of about 504 people.

Genealogical resources

The records for genealogical research are available at the state archive "Statny Archiv in Nitra, Slovakia"

 Roman Catholic church records (births/marriages/deaths): 1706-1919 (parish B)

See also
 List of municipalities and towns in Slovakia

References

External links

 Official page
https://web.archive.org/web/20070513023228/http://www.statistics.sk/mosmis/eng/run.html
Surnames of living people in Jeskova Ves

Villages and municipalities in Partizánske District